Chellala (Arabic: شلالة, lit. waterfall) is a municipality in El Bayadh Province, Algeria. It is the district seat of Chellala district and has a population of 3.745, which gives it 7 seats in the PMA. Its postal code is 32330 and its municipal code is 3214.

Communes of El Bayadh Province